Harnsberger Farm, also known as Golden Creek Farm, has two historic homes and farm located near Shenandoah, Rockingham County, Virginia. The main house was built between 1859 and 1861, and is a two-story, three bay, brick Italianate style I-house.  A library and bathroom were added in the early-20th century. The house features decorative interior painting, which probably dates from the 1890s.  The second house is a rectangular, two-story, two-bay, log house dating to the second quarter of the 19th century.

It was listed on the National Register of Historic Places in 1992.

References

Houses on the National Register of Historic Places in Virginia
Farms on the National Register of Historic Places in Virginia
Italianate architecture in Virginia
Houses completed in 1861
Houses in Rockingham County, Virginia
National Register of Historic Places in Rockingham County, Virginia
1861 establishments in Virginia